Alma Hilda Medina Macías (born 2 December 1976) is a Mexican politician affiliated with the National Action Party. As of 2014 she served as Deputy of the LX Legislature of the Mexican Congress representing Aguascalientes.

References

1976 births
Living people
People from Aguascalientes
Women members of the Chamber of Deputies (Mexico)
Members of the Chamber of Deputies (Mexico)
National Action Party (Mexico) politicians
21st-century Mexican politicians
21st-century Mexican women politicians
Politicians from Aguascalientes
Autonomous University of Aguascalientes alumni